Thomas Corr (born 9 July 1962) is a former amateur boxer. He was born in Ireland. Corr won a bronze medal for Ireland at the 1982 World Amateur Boxing Championships in Munich, West Germany in the light middleweight division. He also won a bronze medal representing Northern Ireland at the 1982 Commonwealth Games.

1982 World championships record 
Defeated Dennis Milton, (United States) points 3:2
Defeated Mirosław Kuźma, (Poland) points 3:2
Lost to Alexander Koshkin, (USSR) points 5:0

1982 Commonwealth Games record 
Defeated David Hall, (Australia) points
Defeated Paul Lewis, (Wales) points
Lost to Shawn O'Sullivan, (Canada) KO Round 2

1984 Olympics record 
Defeated Arigoma Mayero, (Zimbabwe), points 5:0
Lost to Jeremiah Okorodudu, (Nigeria) points 4:1

References

External links
profile

Light-middleweight boxers
Male boxers from Northern Ireland
Commonwealth Games bronze medallists for Northern Ireland
Boxers at the 1982 Commonwealth Games
Olympic boxers of Ireland
Boxers at the 1984 Summer Olympics
Living people
1962 births
Irish male boxers
AIBA World Boxing Championships medalists
Commonwealth Games medallists in boxing
Medallists at the 1982 Commonwealth Games